The 1993 Philadelphia Phillies season was the 111th season in the history of the franchise. The team won the National League East championship and  defeated the Atlanta Braves in the 1993 National League Championship Series in six games, before losing the World Series to the Toronto Blue Jays.

Regular season
After finishing in last place the previous year, the Phillies took the lead in the National League East Division on opening day and remained in first for all but one day (April 9) the rest of the season, clinching the division title on September 28 in Pittsburgh.

The 1993 Phillies were led by stars Dave Hollins, Darren Daulton, John Kruk, Lenny Dykstra, Mitch Williams and Curt Schilling. The team was often described as "shaggy", "unkempt", and "dirty." The previous year, noting the presence of the clean-cut Dale Murphy, Kruk described his team as "24 morons and one Mormon." Their character endeared them to fans, and attendance reached a record high the following season. As a play on the legendary 1927 New York Yankees' Murderers' Row, the team's scruffy, mullet-wearing look was dubbed "Macho Row." To the surprise of their city and the nation, the Phillies powered their way to a 97–65 record and an NL East Division title. Their 97 wins were the most since their back-to-back 101-win seasons in 1976 and 1977.

They had a formidable batting lineup, leading the National League in at-bats (5,685), runs scored (877), hits (1,555), doubles (297), walks (665), on-base percentage (.351), and total bases (2,422). Center fielder Lenny Dykstra batted .305 and led the league in hits, with 194, and runs scored, with 143, both career-highs; he also set career-highs in home runs (19) and RBI (66). Left fielder Pete Incaviglia hit 24 home runs and drove in 89 runs in only 368 at-bats. Catcher Darren Daulton also hit 24 home runs and drove in 105 runs, topping 100 for the second consecutive season. Steady-hitting right fielder Jim Eisenreich contributed with a .318 batting average and struck out only 36 times in 362 at-bats. First baseman John Kruk batted a team-leading .316 and hit 14 home runs with 85 RBI, while third baseman Dave Hollins drove in 93 runs for the second straight season.

The Phillies also had one of the best pitching staffs in the Major Leagues that year, leading their league in complete games (24), innings pitched (1,472.2) and strikeouts (1,117). Each of their five starting pitchers had at least one shutout during the regular season. Curt Schilling and Tommy Greene each won 16 games, Ben Rivera won 13, and Danny Jackson and Terry Mulholland won 12. Closer Mitch Williams walked 44 batters in 62.0 innings, but had a solid 3.34 ERA with 43 saves and averaged only one home run allowed every 20.2 innings pitched.

During the season there were a multitude of memorable moments. In late April, the team rallied from an 8–0 deficit to defeat the San Francisco Giants 9–8 in 10 innings, spurred when Giants reliever Bryan Hickerson slammed the ball to the ground to celebrate an out. In San Diego, a few days later, left-fielder Milt Thompson saved a game by making a leaping catch on a potential grand slam by the Padres' catcher Bob Geren.

Terry Mulholland hurled the first shutout in Mile High Stadium, as the Phils swept the expansion Colorado Rockies in late May. On July 2, the Phils and Padres played a doubleheader that lasted almost 12 hours with rain delays; Mitch Williams won the second game with an RBI single at 4:41 AM. Five days later, Lenny Dykstra ended a 7–6, 20-inning game against the Dodgers at Veterans Stadium with a ground-rule double.

The Phillies survived a 6–14 skid from late June through mid-July that shrunk their lead in the East to three games on July 17. A three-game sweep of the St. Louis Cardinals to end July effectively pushed the Redbirds out of the pennant chase, and Danny Jackson's 12–0 rout of Cincinnati on August 29 left the Cards 10 games out and the Expos  out with one month to go.

However, another slip in September caused some columnists in the city to compare the club to the infamous 1964 team. They lost five of seven games at home to the Cubs and Astros, then lost two of three at Olympic Stadium, which brought Montreal within four games with 13 remaining.

All that was laid to rest on September 28, when the Phils clinched the NL East with a 10–7 win over in-state rival Pittsburgh at Three Rivers Stadium. Mariano Duncan hit a grand slam to lead a comeback, and little-used Donn Pall closed out the game, touching off a wild celebration for their first division crown since 1983. Outfielder Wes Chamberlain ended all the references to 1964, screaming, "It's 1993, baby! It ain't 1964. Where are those ghosts now?". Here is Phillies announcer Harry Kalas's call of the final out of the Division-clinching game against Pittsburgh:

The hit song "Whoomp! (There It Is)" became the unofficial team theme song throughout the season and postseason.

Opening Day starters

Season standings

Record vs. opponents

Notable transactions
 April 13, 1993: Brad Hassinger (minors) was traded by the Phillies to the Atlanta Braves for Mark Davis.
 June 1, 1993: Juan Bell was selected off waivers from the Phillies by the Milwaukee Brewers.
 June 3, 1993: 1993 Major League Baseball draft
Wayne Gomes was drafted by the Phillies in the 1st round (4th pick). Player signed July 27, 1993.
Scott Rolen was drafted by the Phillies in the 2nd round. Player signed July 22, 1993.
 July 2, 1993: Mark Davis was released by the Phillies.
 July 3, 1993: Tim Mauser was traded by the Phillies to the San Diego Padres for Roger Mason.
 August 10, 1993: José DeLeón was traded by the Phillies to the Chicago White Sox for Bobby Thigpen.

Game log

|- style="background:#bfb"
| 1 || April 5 || @ Astros || 3–1 || Terry Mulholland (1–0) || Doug Drabek (0–1) || None || 44,560 || 1–0
|- style="background:#bfb"
| 2 || April 6 || @ Astros || 5–3 || Curt Schilling (1–0) || Greg Swindell (0–1) || Mitch Williams (1) || 18,686 || 2–0
|- style="background:#bfb"
| 3 || April 7 || @ Astros || 6–3  || José DeLeón (1–0) || Eric Bell (0–1) || Mitch Williams (2) || 16,471 || 3–0
|- style="background:#fbb"
| 4 || April 9 || Cubs || 7–11 || Chuck McElroy (1–0) || Ben Rivera (0–1) || Randy Myers (1) || 60,985 || 3–1
|- style="background:#bfb"
| 5 || April 10 || Cubs || 5–4 || Terry Mulholland (2–0) || Mike Morgan (0–2) || Mitch Williams (3) || 21,081 || 4–1
|- style="background:#bfb"
| 6 || April 11 || Cubs || 3–0 || Curt Schilling (2–0) || José Guzmán (1–1) || None || 21,955 || 5–1
|- style="background:#bfb"
| 7 || April 12 || Reds || 5–4 || José DeLeón (2–0) || Steve Foster (0–2) || Mitch Williams (4) || 20,107 || 6–1
|- style="background:#bfb"
| 8 || April 13 || Reds || 4–1 || Tommy Greene (1–0) || Tim Belcher (0–1) || Mitch Williams (5) || 20,482 || 7–1
|- style="background:#bfb"
| 9 || April 14 || Reds || 9–2 || Ben Rivera (1–1) || Tom Browning (0–2) || None || 21,111 || 8–1
|- style="background:#fbb"
| 10 || April 16 || @ Cubs || 1–3 || Mike Morgan (1–2) || Terry Mulholland (2–1) || Randy Myers (2) || 16,255 || 8–2
|- style="background:#fbb"
| 11 || April 17 || @ Cubs || 3–6 || José Guzmán (2–1) || Curt Schilling (2–1) || Randy Myers (3) || 32,680 || 8–3
|- style="background:#bfb"
| 12 || April 18 || @ Cubs || 11–10  || Mitch Williams (1–0) || Bob Scanlan (0–2) || David West (1) || 28,758 || 9–3
|- style="background:#bfb"
| 13 || April 20 || Padres || 4–3  || Bob Ayrault (1–0) || Jeremy Hernandez (0–2) || None || 21,074 || 10–3
|- style="background:#bbb"
| – || April 21 || Padres || colspan=6 | Postponed (rain); 
|- style="background:#fbb"
| 14 || April 22 || Padres || 1–2 || Andy Benes (3–1) || Terry Mulholland (2–2) || Rich Rodriguez (2) || 15,826 || 10–4
|- style="background:#bfb"
| 15 || April 23 || Dodgers || 2–0 || Curt Schilling (3–1) || Ramón Martínez (2–2) || None || 21,702 || 11–4
|- style="background:#bfb"
| 16 || April 24 || Dodgers || 7–3 || Danny Jackson (1–0) || Kevin Gross (2–2) || Mitch Williams (6) || 37,457 || 12–4
|- style="background:#bfb"
| 17 || April 25 || Dodgers || 5–2 || Tommy Greene (2–0) || Tom Candiotti (0–3) || Mitch Williams (7) || 53,030 || 13–4
|- style="background:#bfb"
| 18 || April 26 || Giants || 9–8  || Larry Andersen (1–0) || Gino Minutelli (0–1) || None || 17,170 || 14–4
|- style="background:#fbb"
| 19 || April 27 || Giants || 3–6 || John Burkett (5–0) || Terry Mulholland (2–3) || Rod Beck (7) || 34,005 || 14–5
|- style="background:#bfb"
| 20 || April 28 || @ Padres || 5–3 || Curt Schilling (4–1) || Greg W. Harris (1–4) || Mitch Williams (8) || 10,905 || 15–5
|- style="background:#bfb"
| 21 || April 29 || @ Padres || 5–3 || Danny Jackson (2–0) || Frank Seminara (1–2) || Mitch Williams (9) || 14,399 || 16–5
|- style="background:#bfb"
| 22 || April 30 || @ Dodgers || 7–6 || Bob Ayrault (2–0) || Omar Daal (0–1) || Mitch Williams (10) || 43,679 || 17–5

|- style="background:#fbb"
| 23 || May 1 || @ Dodgers || 1–5 || Tom Candiotti (1–3) || Ben Rivera (1–2) || None || 44,023 || 17–6
|- style="background:#bfb"
| 24 || May 2 || @ Dodgers || 9–1 || Terry Mulholland (3–3) || Orel Hershiser (3–3) || None || 41,102 || 18–6
|- style="background:#bfb"
| 25 || May 4 || @ Giants || 4–3  || Larry Andersen (2–0) || Dave Righetti (1–1) || Mitch Williams (11) || 17,725 || 19–6
|- style="background:#fbb"
| 26 || May 5 || @ Giants || 2–11 || Bill Swift (3–1) || Danny Jackson (2–1) || None || 20,289 || 19–7
|- style="background:#bfb"
| 27 || May 7 || Cardinals || 4–3 || Tommy Greene (3–0) || Joe Magrane (2–3) || Mitch Williams (12) || 33,739 || 20–7
|- style="background:#bfb"
| 28 || May 8 || Cardinals || 2–1  || Terry Mulholland (4–3) || Mike Pérez (2–2) || None || 40,524 || 21–7
|- style="background:#bfb"
| 29 || May 9 || Cardinals || 6–5 || Mark Davis (1–0) || Lee Smith (0–1) || Mitch Williams (13) || 43,648 || 22–7
|- style="background:#bfb"
| 30 || May 10 || Pirates || 5–1 || Danny Jackson (3–1) || Bob Walk (3–3) || None || 29,712 || 23–7
|- style="background:#fbb"
| 31 || May 11 || Pirates || 4–8 || Paul Wagner (1–0) || Mark Davis (1–1) || None || 32,871 || 23–8
|- style="background:#bfb"
| 32 || May 12 || Pirates || 4–1 || Tommy Greene (4–0) || Randy Tomlin (1–4) || None || 24,906 || 24–8
|- style="background:#fbb"
| 33 || May 14 || @ Braves || 7–10 || Tom Glavine (5–0) || Terry Mulholland (4–4) || Mike Stanton (14) || 48,449 || 24–9
|- style="background:#fbb"
| 34 || May 15 || @ Braves || 3–5 || Greg Maddux (3–3) || David West (0–1) || Mike Stanton (15) || 48,425 || 24–10
|- style="background:#bfb"
| 35 || May 16 || @ Braves || 5–4 || Danny Jackson (4–1) || Greg McMichael (1–2) || Mitch Williams (14) || 48,890 || 25–10
|- style="background:#bfb"
| 36 || May 17 || @ Marlins || 10–3 || Ben Rivera (2–2) || Charlie Hough (2–4) || None || 38,519 || 26–10
|- style="background:#bfb"
| 37 || May 18 || @ Marlins || 6–0 || Tommy Greene (5–0) || Jack Armstrong (3–4) || None || 35,805 || 27–10
|- style="background:#fbb"
| 38 || May 19 || @ Marlins || 3–5 || Richie Lewis (2–0) || Mark Davis (1–2) || Bryan Harvey (12) || 33,970 || 27–11
|- style="background:#bfb"
| 39 || May 20 || Expos || 9–3 || Curt Schilling (5–1) || Chris Nabholz (3–4) || None || 28,103 || 28–11
|- style="background:#fbb"
| 40 || May 21 || Expos || 2–6 || Ken Hill (5–0) || Danny Jackson (4–2) || Mel Rojas (6) || 41,146 || 28–12
|- style="background:#fbb"
| 41 || May 22 || Expos || 5–6 || Jeff Fassero (3–1) || Mitch Williams (1–1) || John Wetteland (6) || 37,911 || 28–13
|- style="background:#bfb"
| 42 || May 23 || Expos || 14–7 || Terry Mulholland (5–4) || Gil Heredia (1–1) || David West (2) || 52,911 || 29–13
|- style="background:#bfb"
| 43 || May 24 || Mets || 6–3 || Tommy Greene (6–0) || Frank Tanana (2–3) || None || 32,568 || 30–13
|- style="background:#bfb"
| 44 || May 25 || Mets || 4–2 || Curt Schilling (6–1) || Pete Schourek (2–5) || None || 34,578 || 31–13
|- style="background:#fbb"
| 45 || May 26 || Mets || 4–5 || John Franco (2–0) || Mitch Williams (1–2) || Jeff Innis (1) || 33,367 || 31–14
|- style="background:#bfb"
| 46 || May 28 || @ Rockies || 15–9 || Ben Rivera (3–2) || Butch Henry (2–6) || None || 58,312 || 32–14
|- style="background:#bfb"
| 47 || May 29 || @ Rockies || 6–0 || Terry Mulholland (6–4) || Willie Blair (1–2) || None || 56,263 || 33–14
|- style="background:#bfb"
| 48 || May 30 || @ Rockies || 18–1 || Tommy Greene (7–0) || Lance Painter (0–2) || None || 56,710 || 34–14
|- style="background:#fbb"
| 49 || May 31 || @ Reds || 4–6 || Jeff Reardon (1–0) || Larry Andersen (2–1) || Rob Dibble (4) || 25,676 || 34–15

|- style="background:#bfb"
| 50 || June 1 || @ Reds || 6–3 || Larry Andersen (3–1) || Greg Cadaret (1–1) || Mitch Williams (15) || 24,175 || 35–15
|- style="background:#bfb"
| 51 || June 2 || @ Reds || 5–2 || Ben Rivera (4–2) || John Smiley (2–7) || Mitch Williams (16) || 25,904 || 36–15
|- style="background:#fbb"
| 52 || June 4 || Rockies || 1–2 || Willie Blair (2–2) || Terry Mulholland (6–5) || Gary Wayne (1) || 43,333 || 36–16
|- style="background:#bfb"
| 53 || June 5 || Rockies || 6–2 || Tommy Greene (8–0) || Armando Reynoso (3–3) || None || 43,837 || 37–16
|- style="background:#bfb"
| 54 || June 6 || Rockies || 11–7 || Curt Schilling (7–1) || Andy Ashby (0–4) || None || 55,714 || 38–16
|- style="background:#bfb"
| 55 || June 7 || Astros || 7–5 || Danny Jackson (5–2) || Greg Swindell (5–5) || Mitch Williams (17) || 26,445 || 39–16
|- style="background:#fbb"
| 56 || June 8 || Astros || 3–6 || Darryl Kile (5–1) || Ben Rivera (4–3) || Doug Jones (13) || 24,669 || 39–17
|- style="background:#bfb"
| 57 || June 9 || Astros || 8–0 || Terry Mulholland (7–5) || Pete Harnisch (6–3) || None || 25,389 || 40–17
|- style="background:#bfb"
| 58 || June 10 || @ Mets || 7–6 || David West (1–1) || Paul Gibson (1–1) || Mitch Williams (18) || 22,377 || 41–17
|- style="background:#bfb"
| 59 || June 11 || @ Mets || 5–2 || Curt Schilling (8–1) || Pete Schourek (2–8) || None || 29,594 || 42–17
|- style="background:#bfb"
| 60 || June 12 || @ Mets || 3–0 || Danny Jackson (6–2) || Dwight Gooden (7–5) || None || 31,814 || 43–17
|- style="background:#bfb"
| 61 || June 13 || @ Mets || 5–3 || Ben Rivera (5–3) || Anthony Young (0–7) || Mitch Williams (19) || 29,917 || 44–17
|- style="background:#bfb"
| 62 || June 14 || @ Expos || 10–3 || Terry Mulholland (8–5) || Jeff Shaw (1–3) || None || 13,235 || 45–17
|- style="background:#fbb"
| 63 || June 15 || @ Expos || 4–8 || Brian Barnes (2–1) || Tommy Greene (8–1) || None || 13,142 || 45–18
|- style="background:#fbb"
| 64 || June 16 || @ Expos || 3–4  || Mel Rojas (2–5) || David West (1–2) || None || 14,231 || 45–19
|- style="background:#fbb"
| 65 || June 17 || Marlins || 1–4 || Chris Hammond (7–4) || Danny Jackson (6–3) || Bryan Harvey (20) || 38,855 || 45–20
|- style="background:#bfb"
| 66 || June 18 || Marlins || 7–3 || Ben Rivera (6–3) || Ryan Bowen (4–7) || None || 37,925 || 46–20
|- style="background:#bfb"
| 67 || June 19 || Marlins || 5–2 || Terry Mulholland (9–5) || Jack Armstrong (4–8) || Mitch Williams (20) || 50,391 || 47–20
|- style="background:#bfb"
| 68 || June 20 || Marlins || 4–3 || Tommy Greene (9–1) || Trevor Hoffman (2–2) || Mitch Williams (21) || 58,508 || 48–20
|- style="background:#fbb"
| 69 || June 21 || Braves || 1–8 || Greg Maddux (7–5) || Curt Schilling (8–2) || None || 34,817 || 48–21
|- style="background:#bfb"
| 70 || June 22 || Braves || 5–3 || Danny Jackson (7–3) || Pete Smith (2–7) || Mitch Williams (22) || 41,557 || 49–21
|- style="background:#bfb"
| 71 || June 23 || Braves || 8–3 || Ben Rivera (7–3) || John Smoltz (6–7) || None || 57,903 || 50–21
|- style="background:#bfb"
| 72 || June 25 || @ Pirates || 8–6 || José DeLeón (3–0) || John Candelaria (0–3) || Mitch Williams (23) || 21,173 || 51–21
|- style="background:#fbb"
| 73 || June 26 || @ Pirates || 2–4 || Steve Cooke (5–3) || Curt Schilling (8–3) || None || 39,439 || 51–22
|- style="background:#fbb"
| 74 || June 27 || @ Pirates || 3–4  || Stan Belinda (3–0) || Mitch Williams (1–3) || None || 27,824 || 51–23
|- style="background:#fbb"
| 75 || June 28 || @ Cardinals || 1–3 || Rhéal Cormier (5–4) || Danny Jackson (7–4) || Lee Smith (29) || 29,199 || 51–24
|- style="background:#bfb"
| 76 || June 29 || @ Cardinals || 13–10 || Ben Rivera (8–3) || Tom Urbani (0–1) || None || 39,344 || 52–24
|- style="background:#fbb"
| 77 || June 30 || @ Cardinals || 3–9 || Donovan Osborne (6–3) || Tommy Greene (9–2) || None || 32,098 || 52–25

|- style="background:#fbb"
| 78 || July 1 || @ Cardinals || 5–14 || Bob Tewksbury (9–6) || Curt Schilling (8–4) || None || 39,610 || 52–26
|- style="background:#fbb"
| 79 || July 2  || Padres || 2–5 || Mark Ettles (1–0) || Terry Mulholland (9–6) || Gene Harris (13) ||  || 52–27
|- style="background:#bfb"
| 80 || July 2  || Padres || 6–5  || Mitch Williams (2–3) || Trevor Hoffman (2–3) || None || 54,617 || 53–27
|- style="background:#fbb"
| 81 || July 3 || Padres || 4–6 || Greg W. Harris (8–8) || Danny Jackson (7–5) || Gene Harris (14) || 57,521 || 53–28
|- style="background:#bfb"
| 82 || July 4 || Padres || 8–4 || Ben Rivera (9–3) || Tim Worrell (0–2) || None || 33,379 || 54–28
|- style="background:#bfb"
| 83 || July 5 || Dodgers || 9–5 || Tommy Greene (10–2) || Orel Hershiser (6–8) || None || 33,088 || 55–28
|- style="background:#fbb"
| 84 || July 6 || Dodgers || 5–7 || Pedro Astacio (7–4) || Curt Schilling (8–5) || Jim Gott (15) || 32,993 || 55–29
|- style="background:#bfb"
| 85 || July 7 || Dodgers || 7–6  || Mike Williams (1–0) || Ricky Trlicek (0–2) || None || 41,730 || 56–29
|- style="background:#fbb"
| 86 || July 8 || Giants || 2–13 || Bill Swift (11–5) || Danny Jackson (7–6) || None || 37,745 || 56–30
|- style="background:#fbb"
| 87 || July 9 || Giants || 8–15 || Bud Black (8–1) || Ben Rivera (9–4) || None || 38,695 || 56–31
|- style="background:#bfb"
| 88 || July 10 || Giants || 8–3 || Tommy Greene (11–2) || John Burkett (13–3) || None || 41,869 || 57–31
|- style="background:#fbb"
| 89 || July 11 || Giants || 2–10 || Bryan Hickerson (3–1) || Curt Schilling (8–6) || None || 52,015 || 57–32
|- style="background:#bbcaff;"
| – || July 13 ||colspan=7 |1993 Major League Baseball All-Star Game at Oriole Park at Camden Yards in Baltimore
|- style="background:#fbb"
| 90 || July 15 || @ Padres || 2–5 || Greg W. Harris (9–9) || Danny Jackson (7–7) || Mark Davis (1) || 16,542 || 57–33
|- style="background:#fbb"
| 91 || July 16 || @ Padres || 3–5 || Pedro Martínez (1–0) || Tommy Greene (11–3) || Mark Davis (2) || 20,763 || 57–34
|- style="background:#fbb"
| 92 || July 17 || @ Padres || 2–4 || Andy Benes (10–6) || Terry Mulholland (9–7) || Gene Harris (16) || 32,505 || 57–35
|- style="background:#bfb"
| 93 || July 18 || @ Padres || 6–3 || Curt Schilling (9–6) || Doug Brocail (2–5) || Mitch Williams (24) || 12,569 || 58–35
|- style="background:#bfb"
| 94 || July 19 || @ Dodgers || 7–5 || Roger Mason (1–7) || Omar Daal (1–3) || Mitch Williams (25) || 33,615 || 59–35
|- style="background:#bfb"
| 95 || July 20 || @ Dodgers || 8–2 || Danny Jackson (8–7) || Ramón Martínez (8–5) || None || 35,273 || 60–35
|- style="background:#bfb"
| 96 || July 21 || @ Dodgers || 7–0 || Tommy Greene (12–3) || Orel Hershiser (7–9) || None || 47,893 || 61–35
|- style="background:#fbb"
| 97 || July 22 || @ Giants || 1–4 || John Burkett (14–4) || Terry Mulholland (9–8) || Rod Beck (27) || 35,342 || 61–36
|- style="background:#bfb"
| 98 || July 23 || @ Giants || 2–1  || David West (2–2) || Mike Jackson (5–3) || Mitch Williams (26) || 37,095 || 62–36
|- style="background:#fbb"
| 99 || July 24 || @ Giants || 4–5 || Dave Burba (8–2) || Ben Rivera (9–5) || Rod Beck (28) || 51,557 || 62–37
|- style="background:#fbb"
| 100 || July 25 || @ Giants || 2–5 || Bill Swift (14–5) || Danny Jackson (8–8) || Dave Righetti (1) || 49,935 || 62–38
|- style="background:#bfb"
| 101 || July 27 || Cardinals || 10–7 || Roger Mason (2–7) || Joe Magrane (8–9) || Mitch Williams (27) || 45,383 || 63–38
|- style="background:#bfb"
| 102 || July 28 || Cardinals || 14–6 || Terry Mulholland (10–8) || Lee Guetterman (2–2) || None || 46,346 || 64–38
|- style="background:#bfb"
| 103 || July 29 || Cardinals || 6–4 || David West (3–2) || Rob Murphy (1–5) || Mitch Williams (28) || 55,884 || 65–38
|- style="background:#fbb"
| 104 || July 30 || Pirates || 2–4 || Bob Walk (11–8) || Ben Rivera (9–6) || Stan Belinda (19) || 47,406 || 65–39
|- style="background:#bfb"
| 105 || July 31 || Pirates || 10–2 || Danny Jackson (9–8) || Randy Tomlin (3–8) || None || 48,171 || 66–39

|- style="background:#bfb"
| 106 || August 1 || Pirates || 5–4 || Roger Mason (3–7) || Steve Cooke (5–7) || Mitch Williams (29) || 46,693 || 67–39
|- style="background:#bfb"
| 107 || August 3 || @ Braves || 5–3 || Terry Mulholland (11–8) || Steve Avery (11–4) || Mitch Williams (30) || 49,102 || 68–39
|- style="background:#fbb"
| 108 || August 4 || @ Braves || 8–9 || Jay Howell (2–3) || David West (3–3) || Greg McMichael (4) || 46,144 || 68–40
|- style="background:#bfb"
| 109 || August 5 || @ Braves || 10–4 || Ben Rivera (10–6) || Greg Maddux (12–9) || None || 49,070 || 69–40
|- style="background:#fbb"
| 110 || August 6 || @ Marlins || 3–4 || Luis Aquino (5–6) || Roger Mason (3–8) || Bryan Harvey (33) || 43,670 || 69–41
|- style="background:#bfb"
| 111 || August 7 || @ Marlins || 8–7  || Mitch Williams (3–3) || Matt Turner (2–4) || None || 44,689 || 70–41
|- style="background:#fbb"
| 112 || August 8 || @ Marlins || 5–6 || Charlie Hough (7–11) || Terry Mulholland (11–9) || Bryan Harvey (34) || 43,186 || 70–42
|- style="background:#bfb"
| 113 || August 10 || Expos || 5–2 || Curt Schilling (10–6) || Chris Nabholz (7–8) || None || 43,104 || 71–42
|- style="background:#bfb"
| 114 || August 11 || Expos || 6–5 || David West (4–3) || John Wetteland (7–3) || None || 45,260 || 72–42
|- style="background:#bfb"
| 115 || August 12 || Expos || 7–4 || Roger Mason (4–8) || Tim Scott (4–2) || Mitch Williams (31) || 45,002 || 73–42
|- style="background:#bfb"
| 116 || August 13 || Mets || 9–5 || Bobby Thigpen (1–0) || Anthony Young (1–14) || None ||40,552  || 74–42
|- style="background:#fbb"
| 117 || August 14 || Mets || 5–9 || Bobby J. Jones (1–0) || Danny Jackson (9–9) || Jeff Innis (2) || 46,393 || 74–43
|- style="background:#bfb"
| 118 || August 15 || Mets || 5–4 || David West (5–3) || Anthony Young (1–15) || Mitch Williams (32) || 58,103 || 75–43
|- style="background:#bfb"
| 119 || August 17 || @ Rockies || 10–7 || Ben Rivera (11–6) || Armando Reynoso (8–9) || Mitch Williams (33) || 63,183 || 76–43
|- style="background:#bfb"
| 120 || August 18 || @ Rockies || 7–6 || Bobby Thigpen (2–0) || Bruce Ruffin (4–5) || Mitch Williams (34) || 61,056 || 77–43
|- style="background:#fbb"
| 121 || August 18 || @ Rockies || 5–6 || Marcus Moore (2–0) || Roger Mason (4–9) || Darren Holmes (15) || 53,443 || 77–44
|- style="background:#bfb"
| 122 || August 20 || @ Astros || 6–4 || David West (6–3) || Todd Jones (0–1) || Mitch Williams (35) || 33,080 || 78–44
|- style="background:#fbb"
| 123 || August 21 || @ Astros || 2–3  || Doug Jones (4–9) || Larry Andersen (3–2) || None || 27,507 || 78–45
|- style="background:#fbb"
| 124 || August 22 || @ Astros || 3–7 || Darryl Kile (14–4) || Ben Rivera (11–7) || None || 28,940 || 78–46
|- style="background:#fbb"
| 125 || August 23 || Rockies || 2–3  || Gary Wayne (4–3) || Roger Mason (4–10) || Darren Holmes (18) || 40,481 || 78–47
|- style="background:#bfb"
| 126 || August 24 || Rockies || 4–2 || Danny Jackson (10–9) || Willie Blair (5–10) || Mitch Williams (36) || 43,419 || 79–47
|- style="background:#bfb"
| 127 || August 25 || Rockies || 8–5 || Curt Schilling (11–6) || Mo Sanford (1–1) || None || 46,448 || 80–47
|- style="background:#fbb"
| 128 || August 27 || Reds || 5–8 || Johnny Ruffin (2–1) || Mitch Williams (3–4) || Rob Dibble (19) || 41,540 || 80–48
|- style="background:#fbb"
| 129 || August 28 || Reds || 5–9 || Scott Service (2–0) || Bobby Thigpen (2–1) || None || 42,924 || 80–49
|- style="background:#bfb"
| 130 || August 29 || Reds || 12–0 || Danny Jackson (11–9) || Tim Pugh (8–13) || None || 58,363 || 81–49
|- style="background:#fbb"
| 131 || August 30 || @ Cubs || 6–10  || Dan Plesac (2–1) || Roger Mason (4–11) || None || 33,276 || 81–50
|- style="background:#bfb"
| 132 || August 31 || @ Cubs || 7–0 || Ben Rivera (12–7) || Mike Morgan (8–13) || None || 19,961 || 82–50

|- style="background:#bfb"
| 133 || September 1 || @ Cubs || 4–1 || Terry Mulholland (12–9) || Mike Harkey (8–8) || None || 23,519 || 83–50
|- style="background:#bfb"
| 134 || September 3 || @ Reds || 14–2 || Tommy Greene (13–3) || Bobby Ayala (5–7) || None || 26,157 || 84–50
|- style="background:#fbb"
| 135 || September 4 || @ Reds || 5–6 || José Rijo (13–7) || Danny Jackson (11–10) || Scott Service (1) || 31,166 || 84–51
|- style="background:#bfb"
| 136 || September 5 || @ Reds || 5–3 || Curt Schilling (12–6) || Tim Pugh (8–14) || Mitch Williams (37) || 28,741 || 85–51
|- style="background:#fbb"
| 137 || September 6 || Cubs || 6–7 || Mike Harkey (9–8) || Mike Williams (1–1) || Randy Myers (40) || 30,765 || 85–52
|- style="background:#fbb"
| 138 || September 7 || Cubs || 4–5 || José Guzmán (12–10) || Ben Rivera (12–8) || Randy Myers (41) || 27,041 || 85–53
|- style="background:#fbb"
| 139 || September 8 || Cubs || 5–8 || Greg Hibbard (12–11) || David West (6–4) || Randy Myers (42) || 26,553 || 85–54
|- style="background:#bfb"
| 140 || September 9 || Cubs || 10–8 || Danny Jackson (12–10) || José Bautista (7–3) || David West (3) || 25,894 || 86–54
|- style="background:#bfb"
| 141 || September 10 || Astros || 6–2 || Curt Schilling (13–6) || Greg Swindell (10–12) || None || 31,146 || 87–54
|- style="background:#fbb"
| 142 || September 11 || Astros || 1–4 || Mark Portugal (15–4) || Mike Williams (1–2) || Todd Jones (2) || 45,738 || 87–55
|- style="background:#fbb"
| 143 || September 12 || Astros || 2–9 || Pete Harnisch (14–8) || Ben Rivera (12–9) || None || 46,238 || 87–56
|- style="background:#bfb"
| 144 || September 13 || @ Mets || 5–0 || Tommy Greene (14–3) || Bobby J. Jones (2–3) || None || 17,497 || 88–56
|- style="background:#fbb"
| 145 || September 14 || @ Mets || 4–5 || Frank Tanana (7–15) || Danny Jackson (12–11) || John Franco (10) || 18,292 || 88–57
|- style="background:#bfb"
| 146 || September 15 || @ Mets || 6–3 || Curt Schilling (14–6) || Pete Schourek (3–11) || Mitch Williams (38) || 18,632 || 89–57
|- style="background:#fbb"
| 147 || September 17 || @ Expos || 7–8  || Tim Scott (6–2) || Mitch Williams (3–5) || None || 45,757 || 89–58
|- style="background:#bfb"
| 148 || September 18 || @ Expos || 5–4 || Tommy Greene (15–3) || Denis Boucher (1–1) || Mitch Williams (39) || 50,438 || 90–58
|- style="background:#fbb"
| 149 || September 19 || @ Expos || 5–6 || Tim Scott (7–2) || Mitch Williams (3–6) || None || 40,047 || 90–59
|- style="background:#bfb"
| 150 || September 20 || Marlins || 7–1 || Curt Schilling (15–6) || Charlie Hough (9–16) || None || 31,454 || 91–59
|- style="background:#bfb"
| 151 || September 21 || Marlins || 5–3 || Donn Pall (3–3) || Rich Rodriguez (2–4) || Mitch Williams (40) || 32,165 || 92–59
|- style="background:#bfb"
| 152 || September 22 || Marlins || 2–1  || Roger Mason (5–11) || Bryan Harvey (1–5) || None || 31,556 || 93–59
|- style="background:#bfb"
| 153 || September 24 || Braves || 3–0 || Tommy Greene (16–3) || Tom Glavine (20–6) || Mitch Williams (41) || 57,792 || 94–59
|- style="background:#fbb"
| 154 || September 25 || Braves || 7–9 || Steve Bedrosian (5–2) || Roger Mason (5–12) || Greg McMichael (16) || 57,146 || 94–60
|- style="background:#fbb"
| 155 || September 26 || Braves || 2–7 || Steve Avery (17–6) || Curt Schilling (15–7) || None || 57,588 || 94–61
|- style="background:#bfb"
| 156 || September 27 || @ Pirates || 6–4 || Ben Rivera (13–9) || Steve Cooke (10–10) || Mitch Williams (42) || 15,847 || 95–61
|- style="background:#bfb"
| 157 || September 28 || @ Pirates || 10–7 || Bobby Thigpen (3–1) || Rich Robertson (0–1) || None || 17,386 || 96–61
|- style="background:#fbb"
| 158 || September 29 || @ Pirates || 1–9 || Bob Walk (13–14) || Kevin Foster (0–1) || Joel Johnston (2) || 21,159 || 96–62
|- style="background:#fbb"
| 159 || September 30 || @ Pirates || 0–5 || Tim Wakefield (6–11) || Tommy Greene (16–4) || None || 10,448 || 96–63

|- style="background:#bfb"
| 160 || October 1 || @ Cardinals || 4–2 || Curt Schilling (16–7) || Omar Olivares (5–3) || Mitch Williams (43) || 26,870 || 97–63
|- style="background:#fbb"
| 161 || October 2 || @ Cardinals || 4–5  || Rob Murphy (5–7) || Mike Williams (1–3) || None || 31,501 || 97–64
|- style="background:#fbb"
| 162 || October 3 || @ Cardinals || 0–2 || Lee Guetterman (3–3) || Mitch Williams (3–7) || Mike Pérez (7) || 40,247 || 97–65

|-
| Source:

Roster

Postseason

Postseason game log

|- style="background:#bfb"
| 1 || October 6 || Braves || 4–3  || Mitch Williams (1–0) || Greg McMichael (0–1) || None || 62,012 || 1–0
|- style="background:#fbb"
| 2 || October 7 || Braves || 3–14 || Greg Maddux (1–0) || Tommy Greene (0–1) || None || 62,436 || 1–1
|- style="background:#fbb"
| 3 || October 9 || @ Braves || 4–9 || Tom Glavine (1–0) || Terry Mulholland (0–1) || None || 52,032 || 1–2
|- style="background:#bfb"
| 4 || October 10 || @ Braves || 2–1 || Danny Jackson (1–0) || John Smoltz (0–1) || Mitch Williams (1) || 52,032 || 2–2
|- style="background:#bfb"
| 5 || October 11 || @ Braves || 4–3  || Mitch Williams (2–0) || Mark Wohlers (0–1) || Larry Andersen (1) || 52,032 || 3–2
|- style="background:#bfb"
| 6 || October 13 || Braves || 6–3 || Tommy Greene (1–1) || Greg Maddux (1–1) || Mitch Williams (2) || 62,502 || 4–2

|- style="background:#fbb"
| 7 || October 16 || @ Blue Jays || 5–8 || Al Leiter (1–0) || Curt Schilling (0–1) || Duane Ward (3) || 52,011 || 0–1
|- style="background:#bfb"
| 8 || October 17 || @ Blue Jays || 6–4 || Terry Mulholland (1–1) || Dave Stewart (2–1) || Mitch Williams (3) || 52,062 || 1–1
|- style="background:#fbb"
| 9 || October 19 || Blue Jays || 3–10 || Pat Hentgen (1–1) || Danny Jackson (1–1) || None || 62,689 || 1–2
|- style="background:#fbb"
| 10 || October 20 || Blue Jays || 14–15 || Tony Castillo (1–0) || Mitch Williams (2–1) || Duane Ward (4) || 62,731 || 1–3
|- style="background:#bfb"
| 11 || October 21 || Blue Jays || 2–0 || Curt Schilling (1–1) || Juan Guzmán (2–1) || None || 62,706 || 2–3
|- style="background:#fbb"
| 12 || October 23 || @ Blue Jays || 6–8 || Duane Ward (1–0) || Mitch Williams (2–2) || None || 52,195 || 2–4

|-
|  Source:

National League Championship Series

Game 1
October 6: Veterans Stadium in Philadelphia

Game 2
October 7: Veterans Stadium in Philadelphia

Game 3
October 9: Atlanta–Fulton County Stadium in Atlanta

Game 4
October 10: Atlanta–Fulton County Stadium in Atlanta

Game 5
October 11: Atlanta–Fulton County Stadium in Atlanta

Game 6
October 13: Veterans Stadium in Philadelphia

World series

Game 1
October 16, 1993, at the SkyDome in Toronto, Ontario, Canada

The series' first game sent two staff aces -- Curt Schilling for Philadelphia and Juan Guzmán for Toronto—against one another. The result was less than a pitcher's duel, however, as both teams scored early and often.

The deciding plays came in the middle innings. With Toronto behind 4–3 in the 5th inning, Devon White hit a solo home run to tie the game. The next inning, John Olerud hit a solo home run of his own to put Toronto on top. Toronto added three insurance runs in the bottom of the 7th and held on to win 8–5. Al Leiter pitched  innings—in relief of a sporadic Juan Guzman, who walked four in just five innings—for his first World Series win. John Kruk had three hits for Philadelphia.

Game 2
October 17, 1993, at SkyDome in Toronto, Ontario, Canada

In the second game of the series, Dave Stewart was on the mound for Toronto and Terry Mulholland started for Philadelphia. Philadelphia jumped out to an early lead: in the third inning, Jim Eisenreich followed John Kruk and Dave Hollins RBI singles with a three-run home run to deep right-center. Toronto got on the scoreboard in the fourth inning courtesy of a Joe Carter two-run home run to left, but the Jays were unable to mount a significant offensive push later in the game. Philadelphia held on to win 6–4. Terry Mulholland pitched  innings, allowing 3 earned runs, for the win.

Game 3
October 19, 1993, at Veterans Stadium in Philadelphia

For Toronto, Pat Hentgen faced off against Philadelphia starter Danny Jackson in Game 3. Hentgen pitched a strong 6 innings, allowing just 1 run, and the Toronto offense took care of the rest. Toronto won 10–3.

Toronto manager Cito Gaston was faced with an unusual and difficult decision prior to game time. As the series switched the National League ballpark, Gaston was forced to sit one player from his regular lineup as the designated hitter (DH) would not be allowed to play. As regular DH Paul Molitor had been a hot hand in the lineup, Gaston elected to sit firstbaseman John Olerud and place Molitor at first base. The decision was potentially controversial as Olerud led the American League in batting during the year with a .363 average and Molitor was the less sure-handed fielder. Molitor, however, put these concerns to rest, going 3 for 4, hitting a home run in the 3rd inning, and driving in 3 runs.

Game 4
October 20, 1993, at Veterans Stadium in Philadelphia

In the fourth game of the series, Todd Stottlemyre started for Toronto while Tommy Greene started for Philadelphia. The starters are notable because neither lasted three innings.

In one of the more unusual plays in World Series history, Todd Stottlemyre, trying to go first to third on a Roberto Alomar single in the 2nd inning, did a bellyflop diving into third base, where he was called out. Todd's awkward dive resulted in an abrasion on his chin and appeared to shake him up in the next inning, during which he surrendered a Lenny Dykstra two-run home run. Stottlemyre was pulled after the second inning, having already given up six runs. (Tommy Greene fared little better, being pulled after giving up seven runs in  innings.)

Philadelphia took a commanding 12–7 lead in the 5th inning, courtesy of two-run home runs from Darren Daulton and Dykstra, and a run-scoring double from Milt Thompson.

Toronto fought back from a 14–9 deficit in the 8th inning, scoring six runs on run-scoring hits from Paul Molitor, Tony Fernández, Rickey Henderson, and Devon White. Duane Ward pitched the final  innings, preserving the 15–14 victory.  Three new World Series records included the longest game at four hours fourteen minutes (4:14), most runs by both clubs with twenty-nine (29), and runs scored by a losing team with fourteen (14).

Also, Charlie Williams became the first African American to serve as the home plate umpire for a World Series game.

Game 5
October 21, 1993, at Veterans Stadium in Philadelphia

The offenses were due for an off-day, and it came in Game 5 courtesy of a Curt Schilling (Philadelphia) and Juan Guzmán (Toronto) pitching duel. Schilling shut down the previously unstoppable Toronto offense, limiting the team to just five hits and no runs. Guzman pitched well in a losing effort, allowing only two runs and five hits in seven innings of work.

The two runs scored as a result of scrappy play from the Philadelphia offense. In the first inning, Lenny Dykstra walked, stole second, moved to third on a Pat Borders throwing error, and scored on a John Kruk ground out. In the second inning, Darren Daulton opened with a double, took third on a ground out, and scored on a Kevin Stocker single.

This would be the Phillies' final victory in a postseason game until their championship winning 2008 season.

Game 6
October 23, 1993, at SkyDome in Toronto, Ontario, Canada

The sixth game in the series was a rematch between Game 2 starters Terry Mulholland and Dave Stewart, who would have similar results. Toronto opened up the scoring in the bottom of the first with a run-scoring Paul Molitor triple, Joe Carter sacrifice fly, and Roberto Alomar RBI single. Molitor added a solo home run in the 5th inning, bringing the score to 5–1 for Toronto.

In the 7th inning, Philadelphia fought back with five runs to take a 6–5 lead. Lenny Dykstra hit a three-run home run, Dave Hollins had an RBI single and Pete Incaviglia hit a sacrifice fly. The inning brought an end to Dave Stewart's night, leaving the game with 6 innings pitched and 4 runs given up.

Philadelphia closer Mitch Williams came on to the pitch the bottom of the 9th with Philadelphia clinging to a 6–5 lead. After beginning the inning by walking Rickey Henderson, Williams tried to counter Henderson's speed by pitching out of a slide-step style of pitching delivery. Prior to Game 6 of the 1993 World Series, Williams never used the slide-step delivery in his career.  This may have cut back on the velocity of the hard throwing Williams.  The walk to Henderson was followed by a Devon White fly out and a single by Paul Molitor. Joe Carter came up next and, on a two strike pitch, he hit an inside pitch just over the left field fence, giving the Blue Jays a come-from-behind 8–6 victory, and the World Series crown.

Awards and honors
 Jim Fregosi, Associated Press Manager of the Year

1993 Major League Baseball All-Star Game
 Terry Mulholland, pitcher, starter
 Darren Daulton, catcher, starter
 John Kruk, first base, starter
 Dave Hollins, third base, reserve

Team leaders
 Games – Lenny Dykstra (161)
 At-Bats – Lenny Dykstra (637)
 Runs – Lenny Dykstra (143)
 Hits – Lenny Dykstra (194)
 Doubles – Lenny Dykstra (44)
 Triples – Mickey Morandini (9)
 Home Runs – Pete Incaviglia and Darren Daulton (24)
 Runs Batted In – Darren Daulton (105)
 Walks – Lenny Dykstra (129)
 Batting average – John Kruk (.316)
 On Base Percentage – John Kruk (.430)
 Slugging Average – Darren Daulton and Lenny Dykstra (.482)
 Stolen Bases – Lenny Dykstra (37)
 Wins – Curt Schilling and Tommy Greene (16)
 Innings Pitched – Curt Schilling (235.1)
 Earned Run Average – (Starters) Terry Mulholland (3.25), (Relievers) David West and Larry Andersen (2.92)
 Strikeouts – Curt Schilling (186)

Player stats

Batting

Starters by position
Note: Pos = Position; G = Games played; AB = At bats; H = Hits; Avg. = Batting average; HR = Home runs; RBI = Runs batted in

Other batters
Note: Pos = Position; G = Games played; AB = At bats; H = Hits; Avg. = Batting average; HR = Home runs; RBI = Runs batted in

Pitching

Starting pitchers
Note: G = Games pitched; IP = Innings pitched; W = Wins; L = Losses; ERA = Earned run average; SO = Strikeouts

Other pitchers
Note: G = Games pitched; IP = Innings pitched; W = Wins; L = Losses; ERA = Earned run average; SO = Strikeouts

Relief pitchers
Note: G = Games pitched; IP = Innings pitched; W = Wins; L = Losses; SV = Saves; ERA = Earned run average; SO = Strikeouts

Farm system

LEAGUE CHAMPIONS: Clearwater

References

External links
Baseball-Almanac: 1993 Phillies
Baseball Reference: 1993 Phillies
Philly.com: 1993 Phillies Photo Gallery

Philadelphia Phillies seasons
Philadelphia Phillies season
National League East champion seasons
National League champion seasons
Philadelphia Phillies